Diego Alonso Andrade Torres (born July 6, 1992, from Guadalajara, Jalisco), known as Diego Andrade, is a Mexican professional footballer who plays for Cimarrones de Sonora on loan from Querétaro F.C.

External links
 
Diego Andrade at Soccerway 
Diego Andrade at Fox Sports Stats

1992 births
Living people
Footballers from Guadalajara, Jalisco
Association football midfielders
Querétaro F.C. footballers
Irapuato F.C. footballers
Cimarrones de Sonora players
Liga MX players
Mexican footballers